Cohassett, also known as Lowell, is an unincorporated community in Conecuh County, Alabama, United States.

History
Cohassett is likely named for Cohasset, Massachusetts. A post office operated under the name Cohassett from 1880 to 1919. After that date the post office in Red Level handled the mail. However the original post office building is still standing.

References

Unincorporated communities in Conecuh County, Alabama
Unincorporated communities in Alabama
Alabama placenames of Native American origin